The 1990 CA-TennisTrophy was a men's tennis tournament played on indoor carpet courts at the Wiener Stadthalle in Vienna, Austria and was part of the World Series of the 1990 ATP Tour. It was the 16th edition of the tournament and was held from 15 October through 22 October 1990. Unseeded Anders Järryd won the singles title.

Finals

Singles

 Anders Järryd defeated  Horst Skoff 6–3, 6–3, 6–1
 It was Järryd's only title of the year and the 47th of his career.

Doubles

 Udo Riglewski /  Michael Stich defeated  Jorge Lozano /  Todd Witsken 6–4, 6–4
 It was Riglewski's 4th title of the year and the 9th of his career. It was Stich's 4th title of the year and the 5th of his career.

References

External links
 ATP tournament profile
 ITF tournament edition details

 
Vienna Open